Eva Pinkelnig (born 27 May 1988) is an Austrian ski jumper.

Career
She competed in the 2015 World Cup season. She represented Austria at the FIS Nordic World Ski Championships 2015 in Falun.

World Cup

Standings

Wins

References

External links

1988 births
Living people
Austrian female ski jumpers
People from Dornbirn
FIS Nordic World Ski Championships medalists in ski jumping
Sportspeople from Vorarlberg
Ski jumpers at the 2022 Winter Olympics
Olympic ski jumpers of Austria
21st-century Austrian women